NGC 824 is a barred spiral galaxy located in the constellation Fornax about 260 million light-years from the Milky Way. It was discovered by British astronomer John Herschel in 1837.

See also 
 List of NGC objects (1–1000)

References 

Barred spiral galaxies
0824
Fornax (constellation)
008068